Dingeman Adriaan Henry van der Sluijs (born 28 December 1947), better known by his stage name Dick Diamonde, is a retired Dutch Australian bass guitarist. He was a founding mainstay member of 1960s rock group The Easybeats. Diamonde, with the group, was inducted into the ARIA Hall of Fame in 2005.

Early years 
Dingeman Adriaan Henry van der Sluijs was born in 1947 in Hilversum, Netherlands. His father is Harry van der Sluijs (also seen as Vandersluys) and he has a younger sister. Diamonde emigrated with his family from the Netherlands to Australia when he was four years old. Diamonde was raised in a Jehovah's Witness family, living in the suburb of Villawood near the migrant hostel of that name.

The Easybeats 
Widely regarded as Australia's greatest pop group of the mid-1960s, The Easybeats had their beginnings in Sydney's Villawood Migrant Hostel. All of the five founding members were migrants to Australia from Europe. In mid-1964 the group were formed by van der Sluys (renamed as Dick Diamonde) on bass guitar, he was joined by fellow Dutchman, Johannes van den Berg (known as Harry Vanda) on lead guitar and vocals, George Young from Scotland on guitar and vocals, and two Englishmen: lead singer Stevie Wright (Yorkshire) and drummer, Snowy Fleet (Liverpool).

By October 1969 the Easybeats had disbanded and according to Young, Diamonde was "having a ball just being Dick." In that same month his mother reflected, "He has given up the faith... We never encouraged him to follow this life. As Jehovah's Witnesses we do not believe in creature worship... It is not right the children idolise him." In September 1986 Diamonde participated in a reunion of the Easybeats for a series of concerts touring Australian capitals in the following two months. According to Stuart Coupe of The Canberra Times Diamonde had been "playing with a series of small-time bands up the north-east coast." The group was inducted into the ARIA Hall of Fame in 2005.

Discography

Studio albums 

 Easy (1965)
 It's 2 Easy (1966)
 Volume 3 (1966)
 Good Friday / Friday on My Mind (1967)
 Vigil / Falling Off the Edge of the World (1969)
 Friends (1970)

References

1947 births
Living people
Australian bass guitarists
Australian rock bass guitarists
Male bass guitarists
Dutch emigrants to Australia
People from Hilversum
Former Jehovah's Witnesses
The Easybeats members
Australian male guitarists